Years Ago may refer to:

 Years Ago (album), a 1981 album by The Statler Brothers
 "Years Ago" (song), the title track from the album
 Years Ago, a 1946 play by Ruth Gordon
 ya, an abbreviation for "years ago" used in science